Zeng Yi, may refer to:

Zeng Yi (singer), Chinese singer.
Zeng Yi (painter), Chinese painter.
Zeng Yi (virologist), Chinese virologist.